is a song recorded by Japanese singer Shizuka Kudo. It was released as a single by Pony Canyon on July 17, 1998. Both "Kirara" and its coupling song, "In the Sky", were prominently featured on the CX television series, Kamisama, Mō Sukoshi Dake. Kudo performed the song on the 49th Kōhaku Uta Gassen, accompanied by Taro Hakase on the violin, marking her eighth and last appearance on the show. "Kirara" made its first album appearance on the compilation album, Best of Ballade: Current, for which Kudo also recorded an English version of "In the Sky".

Background
"Kirara" was written by Luna Sea lead vocalist, Ryuichi Kawamura, under the pseudonym ЯK. It is composed in the key of E minor and set to a tempo of 136 beats per minute. Kudo's vocals span from A3 to D5. The song is described as an ephemeral ballad. Lyrically, the song describes a narrator bearing her soul to her lover and calling for him to embrace and love her for who she truly is.

Critical reception
Kawamura received acclaim for crafting a subtle melody that "conjures up beauty and tenderness" and "tugs at the heart". Kudo was praised for her well-matched and moving vocal performance.

Cover version
In 2001, Kawamura recorded a self-cover for his second studio album, Shin'ai: Only One, which also included his version of "In the Sky".

Chart performance
The single debuted at number 22 on the Oricon Singles Chart, selling 15,000 copies in its first week. It rose to number 21 the following week, selling 21,000 more copies. The single continued to climb the charts until it broke the top ten on its fifth charting week, with 43,000 copies sold. It peaked the following week, coming in at number six with a steady 43,000 copies sold, and scoring Kudo her twenty-sixth and last top ten single. "Kirara" stayed in the top ten for three more weeks, until it dropped to number 13 on its tenth week on the chart. The single spent a total of eighteen weeks in the top 100.

With reported total sales of 384,000, "Kirara" ranked at number 65 on the year-end Oricon Singles Chart.

Track listing

Charts

Certification

References

1990s ballads
1998 songs
1998 singles
Pop ballads
Japanese television drama theme songs
Television drama theme songs
Songs written by Ryuichi Kawamura
Shizuka Kudo songs
Pony Canyon singles